Antonio Ramos may refer to:

 Antonio J. Ramos (born 1946), United States Air Force general
 Antonio Sagardía Ramos (1880–1962), Spanish military officer and war criminal
 António Ramos (born 1950), Portuguese equestrian